The following is a timeline of the history of the city of Las Palmas, Canary Islands, Spain.

Prior to 20th century

 1478 - Real de Las Palmas founded during the Castilian Conquest of Gran Canaria.
 1485 - Roman Catholic Diocese of Canarias established.
 1494 -  (fort) built.
 1554 -  (fort) built.
 1570 - Las Palmas Cathedral built.
 1578 -  (fort) built.
 1595 - Battle of Las Palmas.
 1599 - Las Palmas attacked by Dutch forces.
 1625 -  (fort) built.
 1689 -  (church) built.
 1833 - Las Palmas no longer the capital of the Canary Islands.
 1842
 Palacio Municipal (town hall) built.
 Population: 17,382.
 1844 -  founded.
 1845 -  (theatre) built.
 1854 - Miller & Co. in business.
 1858 -  (market) built.
 1879 - Museo Canario (museum) opens.
 1883 - El Liberal newspaper begins publication.
 1890
  (theatre) opens.
  built.
 1891
  (market) built.
 Las Palmas Golf Club formed.(es)
 1892 -  erected.
 1895
 Diario de las Palmas newspaper begins publication.
 1900 – Population: 44,517.

20th century

 1902 - Santa Catalina mole built in harbor.
 1909 -  (football club) formed.
 1910
 Cine Sta. Catalina, Circo Cuyás, Pabellón Colon, and Pabellón Recreativo cinemas active.
 Population: 62,886.
 1911 -  newspaper begins publication.
 1912 -  headquartered in Las Palmas.
 1914 -  (football club) formed.
 1927 - La Voz newspaper begins publication.
 1930 - Gran Canaria Airport opened.
 1940 - Population: 119,595.
 1941 - Casa Palacio built.
 1945 - Estadio Insular (stadium) opens.
 1948
 Archivo Histórico Provincial de Las Palmas (archives) established.
 Arsenal of Las Palmas formally established.
 1949 - UD Las Palmas (football team) formed.
 1952 - Jardín Botánico Canario Viera y Clavijo (garden) founded.
 1956 -  course built.
 1970 - Population: 287,038.
 1981 - Population: 366,454.
 1982 - Canarias7 newspaper begins publication.
 1987 - CB Gran Canaria (basketball club) active.
 1989 - University of Las Palmas de Gran Canaria established.
 1997 - Alfredo Kraus Auditorium built.

21st century

 2007 - Jerónimo Saavedra becomes mayor.
 2011 - Population: 381,271.
 2014 - Gran Canaria Arena opens.
 2015 - Augusto Hidalgo becomes mayor.

See also

References

This article incorporates information from the Spanish Wikipedia.

Bibliography

in English

in Spanish

External links

 

Las Palmas
Las Palmas